Stefan Peno (born August 3, 1997) is a Serbian-Guyanese professional basketball player for Lietkabelis Panevėžys of the Lithuanian Basketball League and the EuroCup.

Professional career
The son of a Guyanese mother and a Serbian father, Peno began playing basketball with the junior youth teams of OKK Belgrade. He joined the youth teams of FC Barcelona in the 2011–12 season. He made his professional debut with the reserve team of FC Barcelona, FC Barcelona B, in the Spanish 2nd-tier level LEB Oro, during the 2013–14 season.

During the 2014–15 season, he continued to play with the reserve team of FC Barcelona, FC Barcelona B, but spent that season competing in the Spanish 3rd-tier level LEB Plata. That same season, he also played in just one game in the Spanish top-tier level Liga ACB, with the main senior men's club team of FC Barcelona. He spent the 2015–16 season with FC Barcelona B, playing once again in the Spanish 2nd-tier level LEB Oro.

Peno made his EuroLeague debut with Barcelona, on 14 October 2016, in a win against UNICS Kazan.

On August 22, 2017, Peno signed a three year deal with ALBA Berlin, with an option to return to FC Barcelona after the first season. Peno won the German double with Alba in 2020, winning both the Basketball Bundesliga and BBL-Pokal.

On August 7, 2020, Peno extended his contract until 2022 and was loaned to Rasta Vechta.

On December 1, 2021, Peno signed with Bilbao Basket of the Liga ACB.

Serbian national team
Peno has been a member of the junior national teams of Serbia. With the junior national teams of Serbia, he has played at the following tournaments: the 2012 FIBA Europe Under-16 Championship, where he won a bronze medal, the 2013 FIBA Europe Under-16 Championship, where he won a silver medal and was voted to the All-Tournament Team and named MVP, the 2014 FIBA Europe Under-18 Championship, where he won a silver medal, the 2014 FIBA Under-17 World Championship, where he won a bronze medal, the 2015 FIBA Under-19 World Championship, and the 2016 FIBA Europe Under-20 Championship.

Honours and titles

Club
Alba Berlin
Basketball Bundesliga: 2019–20
BBL-Pokal: 2019–20

References

External links
 Stefan Peno at acb.com 
 Stefan Peno at draftexpress.com
 Stefan Peno at eurobasket.com
 Stefan Peno at euroleague.net
 Stefan Peno at archive.fiba.com
 

1997 births
Living people
Alba Berlin players
Basketball players from Belgrade
FC Barcelona Bàsquet players
FC Barcelona Bàsquet B players
Guyanese men's basketball players
Point guards
Serbian expatriate basketball people in Germany
Serbian expatriate basketball people in Spain
Serbian men's basketball players
Serbian people of Guyanese descent
Shooting guards